Beganović is a Bosnian surname, borne mostly by Bosniaks. People with the last name:

Amar Beganović (born 1999), Bosnian footballer
Aneja Beganovič (born 1997), Slovenian handballer
Dino Beganovic (born 2004), Swedish-Bosnian racing driver
Dženis Beganović (born 1996), Bosnian footballer
Elvedin Beganović (born 1971), Bosnian footballer
Husein Beganović (born 1971), Macedonian footballer
Sabina Began (born 1974), German actress of Bosnian descent
Samid Beganović (1960-2009), Yugoslav and Serbian footballer 
Agan Beganović and Hasib Beganović, killed in the Cazin rebellion

Bosnian surnames